Louis George Charles (German: Ludwig Georg Karl or  Carl), Prince of Hesse-Darmstadt (27 March 1749, Darmstadt - 26 October 1823, Darmstadt) was a German field marshal in the service of the Upper Rhenish Circle. He is also known in the primary and secondary sources as Prince Louis.

Life 
Ludwig Georg Karl of Hesse-Darmstadt was the son of Prince George William of Hesse-Darmstadt (1722–1782) and Countess Maria Louise Albertine of Leiningen-Dagsburg-Falkenburg (1729–1818).

Wives

Friederike Schmidt (Friederike, Freiin von Hessenheim)

Luise Pfahler nee Weiss

Eva Margarethe Kämmerer (Eva Margarethe von Adelsberg)

Ancestry

References

Bibliography
Gustav Lang: Ludwig Georg Karl, Prinz zu Hessen-Darmstadt. In: Hessische Biographien. In Verb. mit Karl Esselborn und Georg Lehnert, hrsg. v. Herman Haupt. Hessischer Staatsverlag, Darmstadt 1927 (Arbeiten der historischen Kommission für den Volksstaat Hessen). Neudruck, Dr. Martin Sändig oHG, Walluf 1973, S. 465–469. .

External links
http://www.lagis-hessen.de/de/subjects/idrec/sn/bio/id/1338

1749 births
1823 deaths
Louis George Charles
Nobility from Darmstadt
Military personnel from Darmstadt